Pseudotetracha helmsi is a species of tiger beetle in the subfamily Cicindelinae that was described by Blackburn in 1892, and is endemic to Australia.

References

Beetles described in 1892
Endemic fauna of Australia
Beetles of Australia
Taxa named by Thomas Blackburn (entomologist)